Harvard High School may refer to:

Harvard High School (Nebraska) in Harvard, Nebraska
Harvard High School (Illinois) in Harvard, Illinois
Harvard High School (California) in Studio City, Los Angeles, California